4318 Baťa, provisional designation , is a dark background asteroid from the outermost regions of the asteroid belt, approximately  in diameter. It was discovered on 21 February 1980, by astronomer Zdeňka Vávrová at the Kleť Observatory in the Czech Republic. The D-type asteroid has a rotation period of 10.6 hours and is likely elongated in shape. It was named in memory of Czech businessman Tomáš Baťa.

Orbit and classification 

Baťa is a non-family asteroid from the main belt's background population. It orbits the Sun in the outermost asteroid belt at a distance of 2.9–3.6 AU once every 5 years and 9 months (2,113 days; semi-major axis of 3.22 AU). Its orbit has an eccentricity of 0.10 and an inclination of 10° with respect to the ecliptic. The body's observation arc begins with a precovery taken at Palomar Observatory in April 1957, almost 23 years prior to its official discovery observation at the Kleť Observatory.

Naming 

This minor planet was named in memory of Tomáš Baťa (1876–1932), a world-renowned Czech businessman and founder of the Bata Shoe Organization. The official  was published by the Minor Planet Center on 8 June 1990.

Physical characteristics 

In the SDSS-based taxonomy, Baťa is a very dark D-type asteroid. This spectral type is typical in the outermost asteroid belt and often found in the Jupiter trojan population.

Rotation period 

In April 2004, a rotational lightcurve of Baťa was obtained from photometric observations by astronomers at the Palomar Transient Factory in California. Lightcurve analysis gave a rotation period of  hours with a high brightness amplitude of 0.62 magnitude, indicative of an elongated, non-spherical shape.

Diameter and albedo 

According to the surveys carried out by the Japanese Akari satellite and the NEOWISE mission of NASA's Wide-field Infrared Survey Explorer, Baťa measures between 25.79 and 28.26 kilometers in diameter and its surface has an albedo between 0.05 and 0.055. The Collaborative Asteroid Lightcurve Link assumes a standard albedo for a carbonaceous asteroid of 0.057 and calculates a diameter of 21.09 kilometers based on an absolute magnitude of 12.11.

References

External links 
 Asteroid Lightcurve Database (LCDB), query form (info )
 Dictionary of Minor Planet Names, Google books
 Discovery Circumstances: Numbered Minor Planets (1)-(5000) – Minor Planet Center
 
 

004318
Discoveries by Zdeňka Vávrová
Named minor planets
4318 Bata
19800221